Antonio Oposa Jr. is a creative litigator, organizer and activist for environmental legislation in the Philippines. Oposa helped to litigate one of the first class-action suits taken by children to oppose environmentally-harmful actions taken by their government: in the 1990s, he represented 43 children from a local village to stop deforestation around the village that had been authorized by the Philippine government, on the basis that the children's rights would be harmed by the deforestation.

Though the case was initially thrown out in lower courts on the basis that the children did not have legal standing, the Philippine Supreme Court overturned these, affirming the children did have standing; between both legal and legislative action, the deforestation activity was halted. The case inspired several other environmental cases around the globe, with children serving as the plaintiffs to fight for these rights.

For his actions, Oposa won the 2009 non-categorized Ramon Magsaysay Award for his work. He currently leads The Law of Nature Foundation.

In 2013, Oposa sued seven individual and government officials for violating Philippines environment laws through noise pollution from sound amplifier during regular benefit dance events.

References

Living people
Filipino environmentalists
Year of birth missing (living people)
Place of birth missing (living people)